The Saint Paul Tsaramasoandro Philosophate is a school of philosophy in Antananarivo, Madagascar that has served Jesuit seminarians since 1957, and since 1999 has been open to a larger student population. It is run by the Society of Jesus.

See also
 List of Jesuit schools

References  

Madagascar
Madagascar
Educational institutions established in 1957
1957 establishments in Madagascar